The Target Sprint is a summer shooting sport discipline that combines running and air rifle shooting. It is treated as a race, with contestants running 3 x 400 meters with two rifle shooting sessions in between. The shooting rounds are not timed per se, but missed shots result in time being added to the contestant's total. The athletic sports is run under ISSF

See also 
 IBU Summer Biathlon
 Nordic shooting with cross-country running, a Nordic combined running and shooting sport using fullbore rifles
 Biathlon orienteering
 Modern pentathlon
 Roller skiing

References

External links 
 Target Sprint | British Shooting

Multisports
Shooting sports